Sapykovo (Sapıq) is a rural locality (a village) in Izhberdinsky Selsoviet, Kugarchinsky District, Bashkortostan, Russia. The population was 187 as of 2010. There are 3 streets.

Geography 
Sapykovo is located 24 km south of Mrakovo (the district's administrative centre) by road. Karan is the nearest rural locality.

References 

Rural localities in Kugarchinsky District